The 2014 Campeonato da Primeira Divisão de Futebol Profissional da FGF (2014 FGF First Division Professional Football Championship), better known as the 2014 Campeonato Gaúcho or  Gaúcho, was the 94th edition of the top flight football league of the Brazilian state of Rio Grande do Sul. The season began on 18 January and ended on 13 April.

Format
The sixteen clubs were divided into two groups that played matches against clubs in their own group and the other group. The top ranking four teams from each group qualified to the play-offs. The bottom ranked three teams in the overall divisão league standings were relegated.

Teams

First stage

Group A

Group B

Playoffs

Tournament finals
Internacional won title with 6-2 aggregate.

Overall table
The overall table considers only the matches played during the first stage and will define the three teams that will be relegated to play lower levels in 2015. The Taça Champions are placed on the top of the table. The best placed team not playing in Campeonato Brasileiro Série A  (Grêmio, Internacional), B or C (Caxias, Juventude) will be "promoted" to 2014 Campeonato Brasileiro Série D. The best three teams will qualify for 2014 Copa do Brasil.

See also
2014 Copa FGF

References

External links
Federação Gaúcha de Futebol

Campeonato Gaúcho seasons
Gaucho